Penicillium novae-zelandiae is an anamorph species of fungus in the genus Penicillium which was isolated from the plant Festuca novae-zelandiae. Penicillium novae-zelandiae produces patulin, 3-hydroxybenzyl alcohol and gentisyl alcohol

Further reading

References 

novae-zelandiae
Fungi described in 1940